George Griffin (January 14, 1778 – May 6, 1860) was an American lawyer and author.

He was son of George Griffin, and was born January 14, 1778, at East Haddam, Connecticut. He was a younger brother of Rev. Edward Dorr Griffin.

After graduating from Yale University in 1797, he began to study law with Noah B. Benedict of Woodbury, Connecticut. Six months later he went to the Litchfield Law School, and there completed his preparatory studies. In December, 1799, he was admitted to the bar, and in the summer of 1800 he located himself at Wilksbarre, Pennsylvania, and there pursued the business of his profession for six years. In the autumn of 1806 he removed to the city of New York, where he thenceforth resided, holding a high rank in the profession.

For ten years or more before his death he gradually withdrew from the practice of law, and devoted much time to theological studies and to general literature. As the fruit of these studies he published two works entitled, severally, The Sufferings of our Saviour, and the Evidences of Christianity.

He died in New York City, May 6, 1860, aged 82.

1778 births
1860 deaths
Pennsylvania lawyers
New York (state) lawyers
Yale University alumni
American male writers
People from East Haddam, Connecticut
Writers from Wilkes-Barre, Pennsylvania
19th-century American lawyers